Majdel Meouch is a municipality in Chouf District, Lebanon. It has a population of 3,089 as of 2015.

History 
On 7 September 1983, 63 Lebanese Christians were killed by the People's Liberation Army during the Mountain War.

References 

Populated places in Chouf District
Mountain War (Lebanon)
Massacres of Christians in Lebanon